Weston Thatcher Borden  (born 1943) is professor of Computational Chemistry and Welch Chair in Chemistry at the University of North Texas. He is also a member of the Center for Advanced Scientific Computing and Modeling(CASCaM).

Career 
Dr. Weston Borden received his B.A. in 1964, his M.A. in 1966, and his Ph.D. in 1968 all from Harvard University. Dr. Borden first became a professor of Chemistry at the University of Washington in 1977. He joined the University of North Texas as the first Welch Chair in Chemistry, a prestigious award granted through the Robert A. Welch Foundation, at the University in 2004.

Dr. Borden's research focuses on Computational Chemistry, Organic Chemistry, and Organometallic Chemistry. 
The Borden group uses electronic structure calculations to understand and predict the reactions of organic and organometallic compounds, including the contributions of quantum mechanical tunneling to the reaction rates.

Dr. Borden is Associate-Editor for the Journal of the American Chemical Society as well as on the editorial advisory board for Journal of Chemical Theory and Computation and Journal of Organic Chemistry.

Recent Publications Include:

“Diastereomeric N-Phenyltriazatrimethylenemethane Triplet Diradicals and a Perimidine-
Derived Non-Kekulé Molecule by Photolysis of 5-Imino-4,5-dihydro-1H-tetrazoles.” H. Quast,
W. Nüdling, G. Klemm, A. Kirschfeld, P. Neuhaus, W. Sander, D. A. Hrovat, and W. T.
Borden, J. Org. Chem. 73, 4956 (2008).

"Internal Dynamics and Optical Rotations Predicted for Oh- and O-symmetric Cubanes." D. A.
Hrovat, C. Isborn, B. Kahr, and W. T. Borden, Org. Lett., 5, 4763 (2008).

"Calculations of the Relative Energies of the Low-Lying Electronic States of 2 –
Methylenedihydro-phenalene-1,3-diyl: Effects of a 1,8-Naphtho Bridging Group on
Trimethylenemethane and of a Vinylidene Bridging Group on 1,8-Naphthoquinodimethane." H.
Dong, D. A. Hrovat, H. Quast, and W. T. Borden, J. Phys. Chem. A, 113, 895 (2009).

"Slow Hydrogen Transfer Reactions of Oxo– and Hydroxo–Vanadium Compounds: The
Importance of Intrinsic Barriers." C. R. Waidmann, X. Zhou, E. A. Tsai, W. Kaminsky, D. A.
Hrovat, W. T. Borden and J. M. Mayer, J. Am. Chem. Soc., 131, 4729 (2009).

References 

1943 births
University of North Texas faculty
Living people
Harvard University alumni
University of Washington faculty